Kõrkküla may refer to several places in Estonia:

Kõrkküla, Ida-Viru County, village in Aseri Parish, Ida-Viru County
Kõrkküla, Jõgeva County, village in Pajusi Parish, Jõgeva County
Kõrkküla, Saare County, village in Saaremaa Parish, Saare County
Kõrkküla, Tartu County, village in Kambja Parish, Tartu County